The Phar-Mor at Inverrary was a women's professional golf tournament in Florida on the LPGA Tour, held from 1990 through 1992. The 54-hole event was played in February at the Inverrary Country Club in Lauderhill, northwest of Fort Lauderdale. It was sponsored by  an Ohio-based chain of discount drug stores, which also sponsored the Phar-Mor in Youngstown.

Cancer survivor Shelley Hamlin, age 42, shot 66 (−6) on Sunday to win the final event by a stroke over three runners-up; it broke her 14-year victory drought on tour.

Inverrary previously hosted the Jackie Gleason-Inverrary Classic on the PGA Tour  and the Tournament Players Championship in 1976.

Winners

References

External links
Tournament results at Golfobserver.com

Former LPGA Tour events
Golf in Florida
Recurring sporting events established in 1990
Recurring sporting events disestablished in 1992
1990 establishments in Florida
1992 disestablishments in Florida
Women's sports in Florida